Bilmak Raion, until May 2016 Kuibysheve Raion, was one of raions (districts) of Zaporizhzhia Oblast in southern Ukraine. The administrative center of the region was the urban-type settlement of Bilmak. The raion was abolished on 18 July 2020 as part of the administrative reform of Ukraine, which reduced the number of raions of Zaporizhzhia Oblast to five. The area of Bilmak Raion was merged into Polohy Raion.

On 21 May 2016, Verkhovna Rada adopted decision to rename Kuibysheve Raion to Bilmak Raion and Kuibysheve to Bilmak according to the law prohibiting names of communist origin.

References

Former raions of Zaporizhzhia Oblast
1935 establishments in Ukraine
Ukrainian raions abolished during the 2020 administrative reform